Roseicitreum is a Gram-negative, aerobic and non-motile genus of bacteria from the family of Rhodobacteraceae with one known species (Roseicitreum antarcticum). Roseicitreum antarcticum has been isolated from sediments from the Zhongshan Station from the Antarctica.

References

Rhodobacteraceae
Bacteria genera
Monotypic bacteria genera